Ladislao Martinez a.k.a. "El Maestro Ladi" (June 27, 1898- February 1, 1979), was a master cuatro musician. He became the first Puerto Rican to play a cuatro solo on the radio.

Early years
Martinez (birth name: Ladislao Martinez Otero ) was born in the barrio Espinosa of the town of Vega Alta, Puerto Rico. He was born into a humble family of farmers. As a child, together with his brother Encarnacion, he became interested in playing the guitar. He later became interested in the cuatro, a four-stringed musical instrument related to the guitar family. His early teachers were Joaquin La Paloma Gandia and Carlos Soriano. At first Martinez, who lived with his parents, played his instrument at local parties and dances, earning anywhere from $1.50 to $2.00 (US) for each dance that he performed in.

Musical career

In 1921, Martinez and his brother moved to San Juan, the capital city of Puerto Rico. In San Juan, Martinez and his brother recruited the famed guitarist Patricio Toribio Rijos, and together they founded the musical group Trio Ladi.  

In 1922, Puerto Rican radio station WKAQ inaugurated its radio transmission in the island with a program called Industrias Nativas (Native Industries), and Martinez and his trio were participants. It was the first time in Puerto Rican history that the radio listening public was to hear a cuatro via the airwaves. Martinez met many established musicians of the time, among them Felipe ("Don Felo") Rosario Goyco and Ernestico Leocadio Vizcarrondo. Goyco and Vizcarrondo joined Martinez and named their group Aurora. It was during this time that Martinez began to record his compositions and those written by others. He wrote over four hundred musical compositions including boleros, danzas, guarachas, waltzes, zambas and polkas.

In 1934, Martinez and the members of Aurora had two radio programs, Jíbaros de la Radio (Country Folk of the Radio) and Industrias Nativas. They rename their group Conjunto Industrias Nativas and among the singers who performed with them was Jesús Sánchez Erazo, better known as Chuíto el de Bayamón and Tito Rodriguez who as a 13-year-old joined the group in 1936. In the later part of the 1930s, Martinez renamed his group and they became known as Conjunto Típico Ladi. Among the songs which they recorded were the following; En mi Carro te Espero; Alma Boricua; Linda Serrana; Noche de Algodón and El Seis Dorado.

New York City
Martinez moved to New York City in 1945. In New York he continued to perform with his group Conjunto Típico Ladí and recorded over a hundred and fifty songs released on the RCA, Vergne and Sol De Borinquen labels, with songs such as the bolero, Tentación de Besarte. He also had a radio program La Voz Hispana del Aire which aired in New York.

Later years
Martinez returned to Puerto Rico in 1965, after residing in New York for 16 years. He continued to perform with his group Conjunto Típico until February 1, 1979, the day that he died in the city of San Juan.

Legacy
After his death, musicians Sarrail Archilla and Polo Ocasio continued to honor Martinez's legacy by keeping the Conjunto Ladi active. The Institute of Puerto Rican Culture also released a recording of Martinez's music including his famous mazurka, Aurora. His hometown honored his memory by naming a high school after him.

Note

See also

List of Puerto Ricans

References

1898 births
1979 deaths
People from Vega Alta, Puerto Rico
20th-century Puerto Rican musicians
Puerto Rican composers
Puerto Rican male composers
Puerto Rican-cuatro players
20th-century American composers
20th-century American male musicians